The Chou is the clown role in Chinese opera. The  usually plays secondary roles in a troupe.

Peking opera
The  is one of the most demanding in Peking opera, because of its combination of comic acting, acrobatics, and a strong voice.  characters are generally amusing and likable, if a bit foolish. Their costumes range from simple for characters of lower status to elaborate, perhaps overly so, for high status characters.  characters wear special face paint, called , that differs from that of  characters. The defining characteristic of this type of face paint is a small patch of white chalk around the nose. This can represent either a mean and secretive nature or a quick wit. Originally, there were five roles in Beijing opera, but the last role "Mo" became a part of "Chou".

The clown is also connected to the small gong and cymbals, percussion instruments that symbolize the lower classes and the raucous atmosphere inspired by the role. Although  characters do not sing frequently, their arias feature large amounts of improvisation. This is considered a license of the role, and the orchestra will accompany the  actor even as he bursts into an unscripted folk song. However, due to the standardization of Peking opera and political pressure from government authorities,  improvisation has lessened in recent years. 

The  has a vocal timbre that is distinct from other characters, as the character will often speak in the common Beijing dialect, as opposed to the more formal dialects of other characters.

References

Further reading

Chinese opera role types
Clowns